Purabi Mukhopadhyay (1923-1991) was an Indian politician . She was a Member of Parliament, representing West Bengal in the Rajya Sabha the upper house of India's Parliament as a member of the Indian National Congress.

References

1923 births
1991 deaths
Rajya Sabha members from West Bengal
Indian National Congress politicians from West Bengal
Women in West Bengal politics
Women members of the Rajya Sabha